Manjhan Madhumalati is an Indian Sufi text, written in 1545 by Mir Sayyid Manjhan Shattari Rajgiri.

References

Sufi literature
1545 books
16th-century Indian books
Indian religious texts